Ortmann is a central German family name, which in the Middle Ages stood for the job called "ortman." This was an arbiter who decided in situations where there is a stalemate.

Ortmann is the surname of the following persons:
 Anton Ortmann (1801–1861), Bohemian-Austrian botanist, with the botanical authority abbreviation Ortmann
 Arnold Edward Ortmann (1863–1927), German zoologist and botanist, with the botanical authority abbreviation A.E.Ortmann
 Andreas Ortmann, economist
 Chuck Ortmann (1929-2018), former American football player
 Edwin Ortmann (1941) German author and translator
 Friedhelm Ortmann (born 1927), German director of radio dramas
 Günther Ortmann (1916–2002), German handball player
 Oliver Ortmann (born 1967), German pool billiard player
 Siegbert Ortmann (born 1940), politician in the state of Hesse (CDU)
 Siegfried Ortmann (born 1937), German archer
 Wilfried Ortmann (1924–1994), German actor

Ortmann is also the name of
 a division in the town of Pernitz, in Austria

Other variants 
 Ortman
 Orthmann
 Artner, Artmann

German-language surnames